Kerala House is the official state mission of Government of Kerala at New Delhi. Each state of India has to maintain a statutory representative and state mission house in the capital to liaison with the Central Government on behalf of the state.

The complex belongs to the Kerala state government, which is represented by Hon. Resident Commissioner of Kerala state administration. The complex is located in the heart of New Delhi city at Jantar Mantar Road. The current Resident commissioner is Shri. Puneeth Kumar IAS, a senior IAS official.

History
The original main structure is the Cochin House, which was the residence of the Maharaja of Cochin whenever he visited the capital city for sessions of the Chamber of Princes. Built by Khushwant Singh's grandfather Sujan Singh and his father Sobha Singh in 1911, the house is known as 'Vyukunt'. It was from here 
that Sobha Singh supervised the construction of the Rashtrapati Bhavan, Parliament House as well as the North and the South blocks as a senior contractor. Due to rising debts, Sobha Singh sold the palace to Cochin Maharaja H.H Rama Varma who came to Delhi to attend the Chamber of Princes in year 1920.

In 1927, the Cochin Government decided to construct an annex next to the main palace to accommodate an office facility and staff quarters. By 1940, on request of the Government of British India, the annex building was handed over to the government to accommodate the war offices of India. From 1942-1945, the building became the temporary office of the Political Representative of the United States of America to British India (de facto American Embassy). In 1945, the government of India handed over the building back to the Cochin Government.

After Independence, when Kochi joined with the Indian Union, the house became the state property of the Kerala government and chose to adopt it as 'Kerala House', a permanent mission of the state to the Central Government.

Another structure which is administered by Kerala House is Travancore House, the former residence of the Maharaja of Travancore, located close to Kerala House.

Administration

The Kerala House belongs to Kerala State Public Works Department. The house is administrated by  Controller of Kerala House, who reports to Hon. Resident Commissioner Currently Kerala House offers accommodation facility to members of assembly and other politicians from Kerala who visit New Delhi on official duty. 

The controller is assisted by a chief administrative officer and various section officers and assistants. The house has three major divisions functioning
 The Office of Protocol Department, which has a chief protocol officer who oversees all protocols procedures accorded to state ministers and other officials while they visit New Delhi
 The Office of Liaison Department has three departments,

Liaison Wing is headed by the Liaison Officer and is assisted by seven Assistant Liaison Officers.  This office is responsible for follow up and co-ordination of various matters/projects/schemes of Government of Kerala with Government of India including release of funds etc.  This wing also looks after appointments of State Ministers and Officials with various Union Ministers and Officers.

M.Ps Cell

An M.Ps Cell is functioning in Kerala House to cater the official needs of M.Ps from Kerala.  This Cell is also headed by Liaison Officer and is assisted by Assistant Liaison Officers.

Law Wing

A Law Wing headed by the Law Officer and assisted by an Assistant is functioning in Kerala House to effectively take up legal matters of Govt.of Kerala with the High Court, Supreme Court and other courts in Delhi.

PWD Wing

PWD Wing; headed by Assistant Executive Engineer and assisted by Assistant Engineer and Overseers is functioning in Kerala House for maintenance and repair works of Kerala House.

 The Information and Public Relations  wing-

Kerala  Information Office, Kerala House , New Delhi is headed by Deputy  Director of  Information and Public Relations  Department and is functioning in Kerala House for co-ordination works with Media and to look after the PR requirements of the State Government, including the conduct of various cultural programmes. This office organizes press conferences, issues press releases, video footages , photographs and other media coverage activities for  Chief Minister, State Ministers and other Government Programmes.  Information office is also the  co-ordinating agency for the state in major events like India International Trade Fair, Republic Day Parade etc.

Tourism Information Office

A Tourism Information Office headed by the Deputy Director and assisted by a Tourist Information Officer is functioning in Travancore Palace located at K.G Marg to cater the needs of tourists visiting Kerala.

Norka Cell
A Norka Cell headed by the Additional Secretary and assisted by a Joint Secretary/Deputy Secretary and a NRK Development Officer is functioning in Travancore Palace, K.G.Marg to pursue and follow up issues relating to non resident  Keralites with the various ministries of Government of India. NORKA wing facilitate attestation of certificates sent from various attestation centres of Kerala in various embassies, and also address the needs of non-resident Malayalees to the extent possible.

Malayala Bhasha Padana Kendram (Malayalam Learning Centre)
This is a project initiated jointly by various Malayali Associations in Delhi and Government of Kerala. The project envisages to impart Malayalam literacy and cultural heritage amongst the new generation of Malayalee community in Delhi and adjacent area. Central office of padana Kendra is established at Travancore Palace.

Cauvery Cell
Cauvery Cell of the Water Resources Department is functioning at the Travancore Palace basically to follow up the Cauvery Water Dispute with the Cauvery Tribunal. Nowadays the cell is more engaged with the Mullaperiyar Dam issue.

KSEB Liaison Office
This office liaises with concerned Central Ministries and offices on behalf of Kerala State Electricity Board.

Travancore House Art Gallery

Travancore House, located at K.G Marg was the erstwhile Palace of Travancore Kingdom in the heart of the Capital city. The building has been categorized as a heritage building by NDMC. The effort of the state government is to transform this heritage building into a cultural complex and to be a window to Kerala for the outside world. As part of this perspective, an Art Gallery has been set up in the Travancore House.

Resident Commissioner

The Resident Commissioner is the head of all State Government Offices functioning in New Delhi. The Office of the Resident Commissioner, Kerala House, New Delhi was set up in 1964. There is an Additional Resident Commissioner in the rank of Secretary to Government of Kerala to assist the Resident Commissioner.

Structure 

The guest house in Kerala House consists of two Blocks. The Main Block part of the annex building having 33 rooms, including the three VIP Suits and Additional Block having 30 rooms mainly used for families of officials and staff of Kerala House. Rooms are allotted to visiting MPs, MLAs, Government officials on duty, Judges and Judicial officials etc. In some cases rooms are also allotted to private individuals, based on government directives or proper references.

The historic Cochin House has been renovated to restore its classic beauty. The palace has been exclusively reserved accommodating Governor of Kerala, Ministers and VIPs of higher protocol ranking. The Palace features 7 suites and 3 rooms apart from 2 security quarters.

Apart from this a 48 bed Dormitory is available at Travancore House complex. Travancore House features a cultural museum, office of Kerala tourism and reception facility for tourists, a state hall accommodating 100 guests and an amphitheater for 250 delegates.

Guest House Canteen 

The GH Canteen- Samrudhi serves traditional Kerala cuisines to all its residents and outsiders. The canteen also serves other cuisines and prepare as per order, apart from buffet. The canteen serves both vegetarian and non vegetarian preparations.

Other facilities 

The Guest House offers 24-hour house-keeping and room service facility, a medical clinic with resident doctor, a state-of-the-art Conference room & media room, a Business center, Steward and laundry services, in addition to a Tourist reception center and Travel desk.

References

External links

 Official site

Official residences in India
State governments' houses in Delhi
Government of Kerala